Allium fedschenkoanum is a plant species found high in the high mountains of Pakistan, Afghanistan, Kazakhstan, Uzbekistan, Kyrgyzstan, Xinjiang, Xizang (Tibet) and Tajikistan. It is a bulb-forming perennial up to 50 cm tall, producing an umbel of yellow flowers.

References

fedschenkoanum
Onions
Flora of Kazakhstan
Flora of Kyrgyzstan
Flora of Xinjiang
Flora of Tibet
Flora of Tajikistan
Flora of China
Flora of Afghanistan
Flora of Pakistan
Plants described in 1875